"Diving" is a single recorded by American recording artist Bridgit Mendler, featuring American group RKCB. The single was released digitally to retailers on August 25, 2017 via Black Box. The song's music video directed by Vlad Sepetov along Mendler herself was released the same day on her official VEVO channel.

Composition 
"Diving" is a "bass-heavy" cut that has been compared to that of Cassie, Tinashe, and Jhené Aiko. The song lyrically is a nostalgic song about a lost love.

Critical reception 
Sana Parvayz from CelebMix called the song a "smooth jam".

Track listing 
Digital download
"Diving" (featuring RKCB) – 3:40
Vice remix
"Diving" (Vice remix) – 3:14

Release history

References 

2017 singles
2017 songs
Bridgit Mendler songs
Songs written by Bridgit Mendler